In this article, the results of Al Nassr Club of Saudi Arabia in 2010-2011 season is summarized.

Competitions

2010-11 Saudi Professional League

Results summary

Results by round

Matches
Kickoff times are in AST (UTC+3).

2011 AFC Champions League

Group stage

Knockout stage

2011 King Cup of Champions

2010-11 Saudi Crown Prince Cup

Matches

2010-11 Saudi Federation Cup U-23

Results Summary

Results by Round

Matches

External links 

Al Nassr FC seasons
Al-Nasr